The Station may refer to:

 The Station nightclub fire, the fourth-deadliest nightclub fire in U.S. history, in Rhode Island
The Station (Florida), a nightclub and music venue located in Fern Park, Florida
The Station, an alternate title for the 2013 horror film Blood Glacier
The Station, the English title for the 1990 film La stazione
The Station (YouTube), a YouTube sketch channel
The Station (video game), 2018 video game

See also
Station (disambiguation)